Leta Hong Fincher is an American journalist, feminist and writer.

Biography
Fincher was born in British Hong Kong, to a Chinese-American mother with roots in Xiamen, Fujian, and a European-American father. She grew up in Canberra after her parents received tenures at Australian National University. Her mother, a linguist, and her father, a historian, were both Chinese scholars, and she spent a significant portion of her childhood travelling to and from China. As a child, she spoke Mandarin at home with her mother.

Fincher attended Harvard University, where she completed her bachelor's degree in 1990, and later Stanford University for her master's degree in East Asian Studies. She graduated from Tsing Hua University with the first PhD for sociology awarded to an American.

Fincher has written for several publications about feminism, especially in China. For her reports on women and feminism in China, Fincher won the Society of Professional Journalists' Sigma Delta Chi award. She has worked at Radio Free Asia (1996–1997), Asia Television (1997–1998), CNBC Asia (1998–1999), and Voice of America (2000–2003 and 2004–2009), and she has written for the New York Times, Washington Post and The Guardian.

Works
 Leftover Women: The Resurgence of Gender Inequality in China, Zed Books, 2014.  [5][6]
 Betraying Big Brother: The Feminist Awakening in China, Verso Books, 2018.

Sources

Living people
American non-fiction writers
Columbia University faculty
Tsinghua University alumni
Stanford University alumni
Harvard College alumni
Writers about activism and social change
Year of birth missing (living people)